Laura Elaine Jackson (born January 17, 1991) is an English-born Jamaican footballer and coach who plays as a midfielder for the Jamaica women's national team.

Club career
Jackson is a product of Arsenal WFC and Leyton Orient FC. She made her debut for Watford FC in 2007.

College career
Jackson attended Syracuse University and Iona College, both in the United States.

International career
Jackson made her debut in a 1–0 friendly win against Chile on 28 February 2019.

References

External links

1991 births
Living people
Citizens of Jamaica through descent
Jamaican women's footballers
Women's association football midfielders
Women's association football central defenders
Syracuse Orange women's soccer players
Iona Gaels women's soccer players
Jamaica women's international footballers
Jamaican people of British descent
Jamaican expatriate women's footballers
Jamaican expatriate sportspeople in the United States
Expatriate women's soccer players in the United States
Jamaican football managers
Jamaican expatriate football managers
Expatriate soccer managers in the United States
Footballers from Greater London
English women's footballers
Black British sportswomen
English sportspeople of Jamaican descent
English expatriate footballers
English expatriate sportspeople in the United States
English women's football managers
English expatriate football managers